"The African" is a short autobiographical essay written by French Nobel laureate J. M. G. Le Clézio.

Subject
In writing "L'Africain", Le Clézio reflects on his childhood in 1948 when he was 8 years old. According to the publisher he left Nice with his mother and brother to meet his father who was a doctor in Nigeria. His father remained there during the war but was too far away from the wife he loved and too far away from their two children (he had not seen either of these children growing up). In this short book Le Clézio remembers his father, who was a "jungle doctor" first in British Guiana and then in Southern Cameroons and Nigeria. Here you can find Le Clézio's thoughts about his African childhood and about life in remote places. "L'Africain", the story of the author’s father, is at once a reconstruction, a vindication, and the recollection of a boy who lived in the shadow of a stranger he was obliged to love. He remembers through the landscape: Africa tells him who he was when he experienced the family’s reunion after the separation during the war years.The author may seem to be honouring the father from whom he was separated.

Preface
Le Clézio wrote an explanation on why he wrote this semi-autobiographical essay in the form of a short story on the cover of this book and in the second paragraph of the preface  Le Clézio, translated from French

"Ma vie sauvage"
An extract entitled "Ma vie sauvage" can be read in French online (with an introduction by Jérôme Garcin).

Reviews
Marie Labrecque wrote a review in French for Amazon's book review.

Publication history

First French edition

First Spanish translation

References

2004 essays
Essays by J. M. G. Le Clézio
Works originally published in Mercure de France
Works by J. M. G. Le Clézio